United Nations Security Council resolution 2080, adopted in 2012, extended the terms of five judges on the International Criminal Tribunal for Rwanda (ICTR), on the Rwanda genocide. In the resolution, the Security Council also asked for updates on the transition of the ICTR to the International Residual Mechanism for Criminal Tribunals (IRMCT), which was to finish the remaining tasks of the ICTR and a similar tribunal on war crimes and genocide in the Yugoslav wars.

See also
 List of United Nations Security Council Resolutions 2001 to 2100 (2011–2012)

References

External links
Text of the Resolution at undocs.org

 2080
 2080
December 2012 events